Debus is a small lunar impact crater that is located on the far side of the Moon, past the eastern limb. It lies to the east-southeast of the crater Ganskiy, and just to the west of the huge walled plain Pasteur.

This is a circular crater with a bowl-shaped appearance. The rim is worn, and several tiny craterlets lie along the edge. The interior floor is relatively level and nearly featureless.

This crater was previously identified as Hansky H before being renamed by the IAU in honor of former Kennedy Space Center director Kurt H. Debus.

References

 
 
 
 
 
 
 
 
 
 
 
 

Impact craters on the Moon